Annibale Caracciolo (died 1605) was a Roman Catholic prelate who served as Bishop of Isola (1562–1605).

Biography
On 4 May 1562, Annibale Caracciolo was appointed during the papacy of Pope Pius IV as Bishop of Isola. He served as Bishop of Isola until his death in 1605. While bishop, he was the principal co-consecrator of Giulio Antonio Santorio, Archbishop of Santa Severina (1566).

References

External links and additional sources
 (for Chronology of Bishops) 
 (for Chronology of Bishops)  

17th-century Italian Roman Catholic bishops
Bishops appointed by Pope Pius IV
1605 deaths